Mitchell Brown (born 28 August 1990) is an Australian rules footballer who plays for the Melbourne Football Club in the Australian Football League (AFL), having previously played for  between 2009 and 2014 and  between 2016 and 2019.

Brown was selected by Geelong with their first round selection (15th overall) in the 2008 AFL draft, after originally not being considered by most as a top-20 selection. He had previously been playing with the Cheltenham Panthers and the Sandringham Dragons in the TAC Cup.  He was originally not selected by the Dragons until he had a growth spurt and performed well for his school, Mentone Grammar School. He has also represented Victoria at cricket at junior levels.

Brown broke his leg in a VFL practice match and missed the 2009 season. Injuries wrecked his time at Geelong and eventually Brown was delisted at the conclusion of the 2014 AFL season.

In February 2015, Brown was given a short-term contract by Essendon to play in the 2015 NAB Challenge as a "top-up" player, due to 19 Essendon players withdrawing from the NAB Challenge because of the Essendon Football Club supplements controversy. Brown played and impressed in all 3 games for Essendon in the NAB Challenge, playing as a key defender.

At the conclusion of the NAB Challenge, Brown returned to Sandringham in the VFL, where he further impressed as a "swingman", playing at both ends. Brown kicked 23 goals in his 21 games for Sandringham, and was named as the centre half-forward in the VFL team of the year.

Brown was so impressive during his NAB Challenge stint and his VFL season, that he was drafted with pick 54 to Essendon for the 2016 AFL season onwards.

After his delisting from Essendon at the conclusion of the 2019 AFL season, Brown was signed by  during the supplementary selection period (SSP) ahead of the 2020 season.

Statistics
Updated to the end of the 2022 season.

|-
| 2009 ||  || 1
| 0 || — || — || — || — || — || — || — || — || — || — || — || — || — || — || —
|-
| 2010 ||  || 1
| 0 || — || — || — || — || — || — || — || — || — || — || — || — || — || — || —
|-
| 2011 ||  || 1
| 2 || 3 || 2 || 14 || 3 || 17 || 6 || 2 || 1.5 || 1.0 || 7.0 || 1.5 || 8.5 || 3.0 || 1.0 || 0
|-
| 2012 ||  || 1
| 3 || 2 || 2 || 16 || 7 || 23 || 11 || 4 || 0.7 || 0.7 || 5.3 || 2.3 || 7.7 || 3.7 || 1.3 || 0
|-
| 2013 ||  || 1
| 5 || 0 || 2 || 37 || 21 || 58 || 22 || 4 || 0.0 || 0.4 || 7.4 || 4.2 || 11.6 || 4.4 || 0.8 || 0
|-
| 2014 ||  || 1
| 5 || 4 || 3 || 37 || 19 || 56 || 17 || 11 || 0.8 || 0.6 || 7.4 || 3.8 || 11.2 || 3.4 || 2.2 || 0
|-
| 2016 ||  || 28
| 21 || 20 || 17 || 198 || 103 || 301 || 130 || 37 || 1.0 || 0.8 || 9.4 || 4.9 || 14.3 || 6.2 || 1.8 || 0
|-
| 2017 ||  || 28
| 4 || 0 || 0 || 40 || 29 || 69 || 20 || 5 || 0.0 || 0.0 || 10.0 || 7.3 || 17.3 || 5.0 || 1.3 || 0
|-
| 2018 ||  || 28
| 14 || 18 || 7 || 124 || 64 || 188 || 92 || 22 || 1.3 || 0.5 || 8.9 || 4.6 || 13.4 || 6.6 || 1.6 || 0
|-
| 2019 ||  || 28
| 16 || 21 || 13 || 146 || 74 || 220 || 96 || 16 || 1.3 || 0.8 || 9.1 || 4.6 || 13.8 || 6.0 || 1.0 || 1
|-
| 2020 ||  || 38
| 5 || 2 || 3 || 39 || 18 || 57 || 30 || 6 || 0.4 || 0.6 || 7.8 || 3.6 || 11.4 || 6.0 || 1.2 || 2
|-
| 2021 ||  || 38
| 1 || 2 || 2 || 8 || 2 || 10 || 6 || 3 || 2.0 || 2.0 || 8.0 || 2.0 || 10.0 || 6.0 || 3.0 || 0
|-
| 2022 ||  || 38
| 3 || 2 || 0 || 16 || 8 || 24 || 11 || 7 || 0.7 || 0.0 || 5.3 || 2.7 || 8.0 || 3.7 || 2.3 || 0
|- class=sortbottom
! colspan=3 | Career
! 79 !! 74 !! 51 !! 675 !! 348 !! 1023 !! 441 !! 117 !! 0.9 !! 0.6 !! 8.5 !! 4.4 !! 12.9 !! 5.6 !! 1.5 !! 3
|}

Notes

References

External links

Essendon Football Club players
Geelong Football Club players
Living people
1990 births
People educated at Mentone Grammar School
Australian rules footballers from Victoria (Australia)
Sandringham Dragons players
Sandringham Football Club players
Melbourne Football Club players